Roman Stewart, also known as Romeo Stewart and 'Mr. Special' (born 11 May 1957, Kingston, Jamaica, died 25 January 2004, New York City) was a reggae singer. Stewart won the Festival Song Contest in 1975.

Biography
Roman was the younger brother of Tinga Stewart, and recorded his first single, "Walking Down The Street" in 1968. He recorded further singles in the early 1970s for producers Derrick Harriott ("Changing Times") and Glen Brown ("Never Too Young"). In 1975 he won the Festival Song Contest with "Hooray Festival", written by Tinga and Willie Lindo, this success leading to the brothers initially being labelled as "festival singers". He had a big hit in Jamaica in 1976 with "Hit Song" (aka "Natty Sings Hit Songs"), about the desire to have a hit record in order to escape poverty, the same year in which he relocated to New York. He continued to visit Jamaica and went on to work with Phil Pratt and Linval Thompson, having another big hit in 1979 with "Rice and Peas".

Roman recorded two albums of duets with his brother Tinga - Brother to Brother and Break Down the Barrier - and released a solo album, Wisdom of Solomon, produced by Gussie P, in 2001, which included re-recordings of some of his earlier hits such as "Peace in the City" and "Rice and Peas".

On 24 January 2004, Stewart attended a concert by his long-time friend Freddie McGregor in Brooklyn and performed at a party later that night. After two songs, he cut short his performance, complaining of chest pains, and died from heart failure the next day at Long Island Jewish Hospital in New Hyde Park, Long Island.

Albums
Running Away From Love (1979) Island In The Sun
How Can I Love Someone (1979)
Ruling and Controlling (1987)
Diplomat (1991) reissued on Continually (2000) TP (Errol Dunkley and Roman Stewart)
Brother to Brother with Tinga Stewart
Break Down the Barrier with Tinga Stewart
Wisdom of Solomon (2001) Gussie P

Video releases
Stewart appears on the following concert video:
Vintage Reggae Bash - Brooklyn 1983 (2007) Plastic Head (DVD)

References

External links
Romeo Stewart at Roots Archives
Roman Stewart at ReggaeID
Roman Stewart biography, Upsetter.net

Jamaican reggae musicians
1957 births
2004 deaths
Musicians from Kingston, Jamaica
20th-century Jamaican male singers
21st-century Jamaican male singers